Muslimism may refer to:

Islam, an Abrahamic religion
Islamism, an Islamic political ideology

See also
Muslimist (disambiguation)
Muslim (disambiguation)
Islamicism (disambiguation)